Paul Henri Vasseur (10 October 1884 – 12 October 1971) was a French freestyle swimmer and water polo player. He competed in water polo at the 1900, 1912 and 1920 Summer Olympics and finished in third, fifth and ninth place, respectively. At the 1906 and 1920 Games he took part in the 4 × 200 m, 400 m and one mile swimming events, but failed to reach the finals.

Vasseur is the youngest Olympic bronze medalist in water polo. On 12 August 1900, he won an Olympic bronze medal at the age of 15 years and 306 days.

See also
 List of Olympic medalists in water polo (men)

References

External links

 

1884 births
1971 deaths
Sportspeople from Lille
French male freestyle swimmers
Water polo players at the 1900 Summer Olympics
Water polo players at the 1912 Summer Olympics
Water polo players at the 1920 Summer Olympics
Swimmers at the 1906 Intercalated Games
Swimmers at the 1920 Summer Olympics
French male water polo players
Olympic swimmers of France
Olympic bronze medalists for France
Olympic water polo players of France
Olympic medalists in water polo
Medalists at the 1900 Summer Olympics